"Let's Be Friends" is a song by Canadian singer Carly Rae Jepsen, released on February 7, 2020. It was included on the Japanese version of Dedicated Side B.

Background
Jepsen announced the song on social media on February 5, 2020, announcing the title as "Let's Be Friends (Not Really Though)" and sharing its cover art; however, the song was released on streaming services with a shortened title and different cover.

Critical reception
Eric Torres of Pitchfork wrote that the song "doesn’t reach the potent highs of her other work, but as an upbeat one-off that takes pleasure in excising dirtbags from your life, it nails its specific mood".

Personnel
Credits adapted from Tidal.
Carly Rae Jepsen – songwriting, lead vocals
Ben Romans – songwriting, production, guitar, keyboards
CJ Baran – songwriting, production, drums, programming
Randy Merrill – mastering engineer
Mitch McCarthy – mixing

References

2020 singles
2020 songs
Carly Rae Jepsen songs
Songs about friendship
Songs written by Romans (musician)
Songs written by Carly Rae Jepsen
Songs written by CJ Baran
604 Records singles
Schoolboy Records singles
Interscope Records singles